Sarband (Russian and Tajik: Сарбанд, formerly: Kushtegirmon) is a jamoat in north-western Tajikistan. It is located in Spitamen District in Sughd Region. The jamoat has a total population of 8,502 (2015).

Notes

References

Populated places in Sughd Region
Jamoats of Tajikistan